Paul Edward Huston (born April 2, 1967), better known by his stage name Prince Paul, is an American record producer, disc jockey and recording artist from Amityville, New York. Paul began his career as a DJ for Stetsasonic. He has worked on albums by Boogie Down Productions, Gravediggaz, MC Lyte, Big Daddy Kane and 3rd Bass, among others. Major recognition for Prince Paul came when he produced De La Soul's debut album 3 Feet High and Rising (1989), in which he pioneered new approaches to hip hop production, mixing and sampling, notably by including comedy sketches.

His first solo album, Psychoanalysis: What Is It?, came out in 1997, followed by a second album, A Prince Among Thieves, in 1999.

Life and career 
Paul was interested in music from a young age and started collecting vinyl when he was five. According to his mother, he was mature for his age and tended to hang out with older friends.

When he was in fifth grade he started DJing, using a makeshift setup of one Lafayette turntable hooked up to another turntable set and using the balance knob as a fader. In 1981, at age 14, Paul performed a DJ set at The Ace Center Amityville that helped him gain recognition. He did a routine with Trouble Funk's "Pump Me Up" which he later described as his "claim to fame." After The Ace Center performance Paul started doing parties and tapes with Biz Markie while he was in 8th grade. At the same time, Paul's middle school music teacher was Everett Collins, a drummer for The Isley Brothers. Collins later introduced Paul to De La Soul member Maseo.

He began performing with groups during his teenage years, first joining a group called Soul Brothers with his longtime friend Don Newkirk, who would later re-join Paul as an official member of Brookzill! Paul was one of the original members of Stetsasonic. He joined the group in 1984 after impressing Daddy-O with his routine in the "Brevoit Day Celebration" DJ battle in Brooklyn. Daddy-O was struck by Paul's energy, saying that he performed his routine with Liquid Liquid's song "Cavern", "like he was mad at the turntables." Paul credits Grandmaster Flash's song "Flash To The Beat" as the reason he purchased his drum machine.

Prince Paul produced "The Gas Face" and "Brooklyn-Queens" on 3rd Bass' 1989 debut The Cactus Album. The original version of "The Gas Face" was recorded on 4-track cassette tape and started out as mistake. Paul wanted to change the beat after he realized the pattern wasn't what he wanted but MC Serch and Pete Nice convinced him to keep it. The song was recorded on the 4th of July.

He also worked on De La Soul's first three albums, 3 Feet High and Rising (1989), De La Soul Is Dead (1991), and Buhloone Mindstate (1993). De La Soul is Dead received a five mic album review from The Source. According to Paul, 3 Feet High and Rising (1989) had a budget of about $20,000 dollars and took a month and a half to make. In Brian Coleman's 2007 book Check the Technique Paul reflected on his work with De La Soul by saying, "If there was ever a sign of the existence of God, De La Soul would be that proof to me. I’ve never had such a perfect fit in any other production situation."

In 1990, Russell Simmons gave Prince Paul an imprint under his Def Jam label, however the only album, It Takes a Nation of Suckers to Let Us In by Resident Alien, was never officially released. It is available as an unofficial release, which is different to a bootleg.

In 1992, Paul produced the songs "Drug Dealer", "Sex and Violence", and "How Not To Get Jerked" for Boogie Down Productions' Sex and Violence album. Paul later expressed frustration over the experience because the group released it before he had finalized and polished the three songs. KRS-One, from Boogie Down Productions, later apologized to Paul.

Along with Frukwan of Stetsasonic, Too Poetic of Brothers Grimm, and the RZA of Wu-Tang Clan, Prince Paul formed the group Gravediggaz. They recorded a demo together in 1991 and released their first album Niggamortis/6 Feet Deep in 1994 on Gee Street Records. Before signing a deal with Gee Street, Eazy-E wanted to release the album on Ruthless Records. Paul flew to Los Angeles to have a meeting with Eazy-E and Jerry Heller but felt the contract offered to him was one of the worst he had seen in his career and declined. After the group signed to Gee Street, Paul estimated that it took them about six months to complete the album.

In 1995, Paul co-produced guitarist Vernon Reid's solo debut with Teo Macero. He also produced a Horror CIty album with Amityville rapper Superstar. Horror City being a collaborative project fronted by Superstar and featuring a number of MCs and producers. After recording the demo, Paul unsuccessfully shopped it around to multiple labels. Paul used some of the same instrumentals on A Prince Among Thieves and had some of the same people rap on the album, but later said he preferred the Horror City originals. In 2010, after holding on the demo for 15 years, Paul decided to offer it as a free download online.

In 1996, he appeared on the Red Hot Organization's compilation CD, America Is Dying Slowly, alongside Wu-Tang Clan, Coolio and Fat Joe. The CD, meant to raise awareness of the AIDS epidemic among African American men, was called a masterpiece by The Source magazine.

In 1996, during the early recording sessions for Stakes Is High, De La Soul and Prince Paul decided to part ways.  Although Paul was not involved in the making of the album, he has praised it in several interviews, once saying, "I was going through a serious transition period in my life when that album dropped. I was trying to figure out the next thing I was going to do; I was going through a custody case for my son, and I was running out of money. There were a lot of things going on at the time and in a sense, that album pulled me through everything."

After this he released two solo albums: Psychoanalysis: What Is It? and A Prince Among Thieves, featuring Big Daddy Kane, Xzibit, Kool Keith, and Everlast. When Paul was recording Psychoanalysis he thought his career was over and had a hard time finding people who wanted to be involved with the project. Many of the vocals were provided by friends of his from outside the music industry. Years later he recalled thinking, "Some people might get butt-hurt about it, but so what? It’s probably the last record I’ll make anyway,” during the recording of "Beautiful Night (Manic Psychopath)". The song is very dark and deals with date rape, racism, and violence.

According to Paul, he originally proposed the idea for A Prince Among Thieves to Russell Simmons in the early 1990s but Simmons was not interested. While describing his goals for the album in an interview he said, "I wanted to make a movie on wax. I wanted to make an adults’ kid album." To prepare for the album he watched many B movies and tried to use scenes from various films as inspiration. In addition to the extensive list of rappers on the album, Paul reached out to Vanilla Ice to perform on "Handle Your Time" with Sadat X and Xzibit. He also reached out to The Notorious B.I.G. about playing a role on the album and was supposed to meet up with him the night he was murdered.

Prince Paul formed Handsome Boy Modeling School with Dan the Automator and their album So... How's Your Girl? featured Sean Lennon, Del the Funky Homosapien, Alec Empire, and Don Novello. He was also paired up with Deltron 3030 on their self-titled album for the song The Fantabulous Rap Extravaganza. In 2000, Prince Paul produced MC Paul Barman's début EP It's Very Stimulating, followed by another Handsome Boy Modeling School album, White People, with guests including the RZA, Linkin Park, Tim Meadows, and John Oates.

Prince Paul's 2003 album Politics of the Business again featured many guests such as Chuck D, Ice-T, The Beatnuts, and Wordsworth. The latter also collaborated on a track Paul composed for The SpongeBob SquarePants Movie soundtrack.

In 2006, Paul won a Grammy Award for Best Comedy Album at the 48th Annual Grammy Awards for his work on Chris Rock's Never Scared album, the first of his career.

Several songs by Paul have been featured only on compilations such as Om Records's "Deep Concentration" and Bill Laswell's "Altered Beats".

In 2005, he released the album Itstrumental. It encompasses a range of genres, relying heavily on past samples, especially from A Prince Among Thieves, and combining them with lighthearted skits about his depression. He also produced the album The Art of Picking Up Women by the Dix, which combines some of hip-hop's misogyny and boasting with 1960s-style R&B.

Paul was the host of XM radio's "The Ill Out Show", until the station was dropped following its merger with Sirius. The show presented news, classic songs, and interviews with various hip-hop artists.

One of Prince Paul's more recent projects is Baby Elephant, a collaboration with Parliament and Talking Heads keyboardist Bernie Worrell, and longtime Paul associate Don Newkirk. An album Turn My Teeth Up!, released in September 2007, features George Clinton, Shock G, Yellowman, Reggie Watts, Nona Hendryx, David Byrne, and Gabby La La.

In 2008–2009, Paul collaborated with Oakland rap group Souls of Mischief on the group's album Montezuma's Revenge (2009). The idea for the album came about during a Handsome Boy Modeling School tour when Paul told Souls of Mischief member Opio, "Tell the guys that I want to produce the next album."  The album was recorded in a rented house and many of the beats were made with vintage equipment, including an Emu SP-12, Ensoniq ASR-10, Akai MPC-60 and an Akai MPC-2000. Paul stated in an interview that his two favorite songs from the album are "Proper Aim" and "Morgan Freeman Skit".

In 2012, Paul spoke openly in an interview about the possibility of doing another De La Soul album after Maseo had made some public comments about a reunion. In the interview, Paul states that he asked the members of De La Soul to work on a new album on and off since 1999. Though he wanted to do a reunion at one time, it seemed in the interview he had moved past the idea, partially because of the far more restrictive sampling laws that exist today. He said, "It’s nice to think about it, but I kind of like where we left it. There would be so many expectations. For me to do another De La record, I don’t think I could really live up to it. Especially in a day and age where I can’t openly sample like that."

Paul later released Throwback to the Future with his Brazilian hip hop fusion group BROOKZILL! in 2016. In 2017 Prince Paul helped score the Gimlet Media podcast Mogul about hip-hop scene-maker Chris Lighty.

In 2017, Prince Paul joined the Creators Advisory Board of Tracklib. In an interview with Tracklib, Prince Paul stated that "I know Tracklib will help (producers) because it will give everybody an opportunity to sample without having to look over their shoulder.".

In 2020, Prince Paul co-produced the Gorillaz song "Pac-Man" for the band's Song Machine web series. This was Prince Paul's first contribution to Gorillaz, whose 2001 debut album was produced by Prince Paul's long-time friend and collaborator Dan The Automator, who he co-founded Handsome Boy Modeling School with in 1999.

Equipment 
Paul has talked about his fondness for vintage equipment in several interviews. One of his favorite pieces of vintage equipment is the Akai S900, which he credits for having a unique sound, saying, "Even though it's big and bulky, nothing sounds like that. It's pretty flexible, it's easy to work, and it's easy to truncate your sample and get things tight...When you look at all this new technology, everything sounds very sterile. Everything is clean and super quiet. It kind of lacks something. When I plug that in, it's like, 'Wow, this is hip hop.'"

Record collection 
He is known for sampling from a wide range of genres. Rapper Biz Markie once said of Paul's production style, "Prince Paul's contribution to hip-hop is that you could use records that weren't by James Brown or just break-beats."

Style and influences 
Paul credits The Bomb Squad and Public Enemy as being a significant influence on early De La Soul production, saying, "Early Public Enemy production used layers upon layers and layers, and their arrangements were always super duper incredible to me. We were kind of like students to what they did." In addition to The Bomb Squad, he also lists George Clinton, Dr. Dre, Rick Rubin, and Bernie Worrell as his major influences.

While Paul continues to utilize samples, he has expanded his production to include live instrumentation, including guitar, bass guitar, and several analog keyboards. To combine elements of sampling and live instrumentation, Paul now re-plays some of his samples with instruments. In a 2010 interview he described the process by saying, "I’ve gotten to the point now where I’ll re-play samples with instruments. I learned how to interpolate, change the sound, and dust it out so that when I’m re-playing certain samples, it sounds like a direct sample from a record."

Paul has credited the process of working with Dan the Automator on the Handsome Boy Modeling School project as helping him learn a great deal about production.

Influence 
Chris Rock listed the Buhloone Mindstate album at number ten on his "Top 25 Albums" list. He credited the album as helping to shape him as a comedian. In 1999, Rock appeared on Paul's A Prince Among Thieves. Later in 2005, Rock's debut album was produced by Paul.

Discography

Solo albums 
 1996: Psychoanalysis: What Is It? (WordSound Records, later reissued by Tommy Boy/Warner Bros. Records in 1997 with bonus cuts)
 1999: A Prince Among Thieves (Tommy Boy/Warner Bros. Records)
 2003: Politics of the Business (Razor & Tie)
 2005: Itstrumental (Female Fun Records)
 2005: Hip Hop Gold Dust (Antidote)

Collaborative albums 
 1986:  On Fire (Stetsasonic)
 1988:  In Full Gear (Stetsasonic)
 1989:  3 Feet High and Rising (De La Soul)
 1991:  Blood, Sweat & No Tears (Stetsasonic)
 1991:  De La Soul Is Dead (De La Soul)
 1992:  It Takes a Nation of Suckas to Let Us In (Resident Alien) (later released as a free download)
 1993:  Buhloone Mindstate (De La Soul)
 1994:  Niggamortis/6 Feet Deep (Gravediggaz)
 1995:  Prince Paul presents Horror City  (Horror City) (later released as a free download)
 1999:  So... How's Your Girl? (Handsome Boy Modeling School)
 2000:  It's Very Stimulating (MC Paul Barman)
 2004:  White People (Handsome Boy Modeling School)
 2005:  The Art of Picking Up Women (The Dix)
 2008:  Baby Loves Hip Hop presents The Dino 5 (Dino 5)
 2012:  Negroes on Ice (Negroes on Ice)
 2016:  Throwback to the Future (BROOKZILL!)

Awards and nominations 

!
|-
|align=center|2006
|Never Scared
|Grammy Award for Best Comedy Album
|
|
|-

References

External links 
 
 Prince Paul RBMA video lecture session

1967 births
African-American male rappers
African-American record producers
American hip hop DJs
American hip hop record producers
Place of birth missing (living people)
East Coast hip hop musicians
Five percenters
Grammy Award winners
Gravediggaz members
Horrorcore artists
Living people
People from Amityville, New York
Rappers from New York (state)
Tommy Boy Records artists
Stetsasonic members
21st-century American rappers
Record producers from New York (state)
21st-century American male musicians
Dino 5 members